This article is a list of diseases of peas (Pisum sativum).

Bacterial diseases

Fungal diseases

Nematodes, parasitic

Viral diseases

Peas
Pulse crop diseases

References
Common Names of Diseases, The American Phytopathological Society